Visa requirements for Mexican citizens are administrative entry restrictions by the authorities of other states placed on citizens of Mexico. As of January 10, 2023, Mexican citizens had visa-free or visa on arrival access to 159 countries and territories ranking the Mexican passport 24th in terms of travel freedom according to the Henley Passport Index.

Visa requirements map

Visa requirements

Dependent, disputed, or restricted territories
Unrecognized or partially recognized countries

Dependent and autonomous territories

Other territories
. Ashmore and Cartier Islands – Special authorisation required.
. Brest and Grodno – Visa-free for 10 days
. Hainan – Visa on arrival for 15 days. Available at Haikou Meilan International Airport and Sanya Phoenix International Airport. Visa not required for 21 days for traveling as part of a tourist group (2 or more people)
. Tibet Autonomous Region – Tibet Travel Permit required (10 US Dollars).
. San Andrés and Leticia – Visitors arriving at Gustavo Rojas Pinilla International Airport and Alfredo Vásquez Cobo International Airport must buy tourist cards on arrival.
.  Galápagos – Online pre-registration is required. Transit Control Card must also be obtained at the airport prior to departure.
 outside Asmara – To travel in the rest of the country, a Travel Permit for Foreigners is required (20 Eritrean nakfa).
. Lau Province – Special permission required.
  Mount Athos – Special permit required (4 days: 25 euro for Orthodox visitors, 35 euro for non-Orthodox visitors, 18 euro for students). There is a visitors' quota: maximum 100 Orthodox and 10 non-Orthodox per day and women are not allowed.
. Protected Area Permit (PAP) required for whole states of Nagaland and Sikkim and parts of states Manipur, Arunachal Pradesh, Uttaranchal, Jammu and Kashmir, Rajasthan, Himachal Pradesh. Restricted Area Permit (RAP) required for all of Andaman and Nicobar Islands and parts of Sikkim. Some of these requirements are occasionally lifted for a year.
. Kish Island – Visa not required.
. Closed cities – Special permission required for the town of Baikonur and surrounding areas in Kyzylorda Oblast, and the town of Gvardeyskiy near Almaty.
 outside Pyongyang – Special permit required. People are not allowed to leave the capital city, tourists can only leave the capital with a governmental tourist guide (no independent moving).
.  Sabah and  Sarawak – Visa not required. These states have their own immigration authorities and passport is required to travel to them, however the same visa applies.
 outside Malé – Permission required. Tourists are generally prohibited from visiting non-resort islands without the express permission of the Government of Maldives.
. Several closed cities and regions in Russia – Special authorization required.
 Mecca and Medina – Special access required. Non-Muslims and those following the Ahmadiyya religious movement are strictly prohibited from entry.
. Darfur – Separate travel permit is required.
 outside Khartoum – All foreigners traveling more than 25 kilometers outside of Khartoum must obtain a travel permit.
. Gorno-Badakhshan Autonomous Province – OIVR permit required (15+5 Tajikistani Somoni) and another special permit (free of charge) is required for Lake Sarez.
. Closed cities – A special permit, issued prior to arrival by Ministry of Foreign Affairs, is required if visiting the following places: Atamurat, Cheleken, Dashoguz, Serakhs and Serhetabat.
. Closed city of Mercury, Nevada, United States – Special authorization is required for entry into Mercury.
. United States Minor Outlying Islands – Special permits required for Baker Island, Howland Island, Jarvis Island, Johnston Atoll, Kingman Reef, Midway Atoll, Palmyra Atoll and Wake Island.
. Margarita Island – Visa not required. All visitors are fingerprinted.
. Phú Quốc – Visa not required for 30 days.
 outside Sana'a or Aden – Special permission needed for travel outside Sana'a or Aden.
 UN Buffer Zone in Cyprus – Access Permit is required for travelling inside the zone, except Civil Use Areas.
 Korean Demilitarized Zone – Restricted area.
 UNDOF Zone and Ghajar – Restricted area.

APEC Business Travel Card

Holders of an APEC Business Travel Card (ABTC)  travelling on business do not require a visa to the following countries:

1 – up to 90 days
2 – up to 60 days
3 – up to 59 days

The card must be used in conjunction with a passport and has the following advantages:
undertake legitimate business in participating economies
expedited border crossing in all member economies, including transitional members
expedited scheduling of visa interview (United States)

Non-visa restrictions

See also 

 Visa policy of Mexico
 Mexican passport

References and Notes
References

Notes

Mexico
Foreign relations of Mexico

es:Pasaporte mexicano